Saint Mo Ling (614–697), also named Moling Luachra, was the second Bishop of Ferns in Ireland and has been said to be "one of the four great prophets of Erin". He founded a monastery at St Mullin's, County Carlow. His feast day is 17 June.

See also

Eithne and Sodelb

References

External links

Saint Moling et le Lépreux, a story about Mo Ling and a leper, edited from UCD Franciscan Manuscript A9 and translated into French by Paul Grosjean S.J. at Thesaurus Linguae Hibernicae

Further reading
 
 
 

7th-century Christian saints
7th-century Irish bishops
696 deaths
Medieval saints of Leinster
Holy wells in Ireland
614 births